Dale Gray (born 15 February 1978 in Edinburgh) is a Scottish footballer who played in defence or midfield. Gray began his career with Dundee United and made two appearances in the 1995-96 Scottish Challenge Cup campaign, featuring in the quarter- and semi-final victories, but failed to appear in the league. Following his release from Dundee United in June 1999, Gray moved to Ireland with Sligo Rovers, who were managed by his former United teammate Jim McInally, before coming back to Scotland to finish the season with Cowdenbeath. In September 2000, Gray moved to Berwick Rangers, where he spent three seasons before his release in June 2003.

References

External links

See also
Dundee United F.C. season 1995-96

1978 births
Living people
Footballers from Edinburgh
Scottish footballers
Scottish Football League players
Dundee United F.C. players
Sligo Rovers F.C. players
League of Ireland players
Cowdenbeath F.C. players
Berwick Rangers F.C. players
Association football defenders
Association football midfielders
Expatriate association footballers in the Republic of Ireland